The 2017 Horizon League men's basketball tournament (also known as Motor City Madness) was the conference tournament for the Horizon League. It was played from March 3 through March 7, 2017 at Joe Louis Arena in Detroit. Northern Kentucky defeated Milwaukee in the championship game to win the tournament championship. As a result, Northern Kentucky received the conference's automatic berth into the 2017 NCAA Division I men's basketball tournament with a 59-53 win over Milwaukee.

Seeds
All 10 teams participated in the tournament. The top six teams receive a bye into the quarterfinals. This was a change from the previous season where the top two seeds received double byes into the semifinals. Teams were seeded by record within the conference, with a tiebreaker system to seed teams with identical conference records.

Schedule

Bracket

References

Tournament
Horizon League men's basketball tournament
Horizon League men's basketball tournament
Horizon League men's basketball tournament
Basketball competitions in Detroit
College sports tournaments in Michigan
2017 in Detroit